The Big Powerful Owl is a sculpture eight metres tall, designed by Bruce Armstrong and located in the Belconnen District of Canberra, Australia.

Built in 2011, it is one of the numerous Australia's big things, with this being only one of many in the ACT.

Criticism
The shape of the owl has been criticised for its phallic shape, however, it remains a tourist attraction, with Tara Cheyne calling it a "must see".

The statue has also been prone to graffiti; the ACT government had to spend A$3000 on cleaning it up.

References 

Buildings and structures in Canberra
Australian Megasculptures
Vandalized works of art
Owls in culture
Public art in the Australian Capital Territory